Przysietnica  is a village in the administrative district of Gmina Brzozów, within Brzozów County, Podkarpacie Voivodeship, in southern Poland.

The village has a population of 4,000.

References

Przysietnica